was a New Zealand seaman, cashier, gum-digger and farmer.

References

1868 births
1942 deaths
New Zealand sailors
New Zealand farmers
New Zealand people of Japanese descent
New Zealand gum-diggers